The Metro Manila Film Festival Award for Best Musical Score is an award presented annually by the Metropolitan Manila Development Authority (MMDA). It was first awarded at the 1st Metro Manila Film Festival ceremony, held in 1975; George Canseco won the award for his musical score in Batu-Bato sa Langit and it recognizes the finest or most euphonic sound mixing or recording, and is generally awarded to the production sound mixers and re-recording mixers of the winning film. Currently, nominees and winners are determined by Executive Committees, headed by the Metropolitan Manila Development Authority Chairman and key members of the film industry.

Winners and nominees

1970s

1980s

1990s

2000s

2010s

2020s

Notes

References

External links
IMDB: Metro Manila Film Festival
Official website of the Metro Manila Film Festival

Musical Score